50,000 (fifty thousand) is the natural number that comes after 49,999 and before 50,001.

Selected numbers in the range 50001–59999

50001 to 50999
 50069 = 11 + 22 + 33 + 44 + 55 + 66
 50400 = highly composite number
 50625 = 154, smallest fourth power that can be expressed as the sum of only five distinct fourth powers, palindromic in base 14 (1464114)
 50653 = 373, palindromic in base 6 (10303016)

51000 to 51999
 51076 = 2262, palindromic in base 15 (1020115)
 51641 = Markov number
 51984 = 2282 = 373 + 113. the smallest square to the sum of only five distinct fourth powers.

52000 to 52999
 52488 = 3-smooth number
 52633 = Carmichael number

53000 to 53999
 53016 = pentagonal pyramidal number
 53361 = 2312 sum of the cubes of the first 21 positive integers

54000 to 54999
 54205 = Zeisel number
 54688 = 2-automorphic number
 54748 = narcissistic number
 54872 = 383, palindromic in base 9 (832389)
 54901 = chiliagonal number

55000 to 55999
 55296 = 3-smooth number
 55440 = superior highly composite number; colossally abundant number
 55459 = one of five remaining Seventeen or Bust numbers in the Sierpinski problem
 55555 = repdigit
 55860 = harmonic divisor number
 55987 = repunit prime in base 6

56000 to 56999
 56011 = Wedderburn-Etherington number
 56092 = the number of groups of order 256, see 
 56169 = 2372, palindromic in octal (155518)
 56448 = pentagonal pyramidal number

57000 to 57999
 57121 = 2392, palindromic in base 14 (16B6114)

58000 to 58999
 58081 = 2412, palindromic in base 15 (1232115)
 58367 = smallest integer that cannot be expressed as a sum of fewer than 1079 tenth powers
 58786 = Catalan number
 58921 = Friedman prime

59000 to 59999
 59049 = 2432 = 95 = 310
 59051 = Friedman prime
 59053 = Friedman prime
 59081 = Zeisel number
 59263 = Friedman prime
 59273 = Friedman prime
 59319 = 393
 59536 = 2442, palindromic in base 11 (4080411)

There are 924 prime numbers between 50000 and 60000.

References

50000